Gotland Anti-Aircraft Corps, also Lv 2, was a Swedish Army anti-aircraft unit that was active in various forms between 1944–2000. The unit was based in Visby on Gotland.

History
Gotland's air defence has its origins in the Stockholm Anti-Aircraft Regiment's (Lv 3) artillery battery detachment on Gotland (Lv 3 G), established in 1944. When Stockholm Anti-Aircraft Regiment moved to Norrtälje in 1953, the responsibility for the artillery battery on Gotland was transferred to Östgöta Anti-Aircraft Regiment (Lv 2) in Linköping and thus the unit received the designation Lv 2 G. Östgöta Anti-Aircraft Regiment was disbanded in 1962. Lv 2 G took over its ensign and traditions on 2 April. On 1 April 1963, Lv 2 G became the new Lv 2. On 1 July 1968, the term "division" was changed to battalion. Lv 2 was then named Royal Gotland Anti-Aircraft Battalion. In 1969, the battalion received the heat-seeking anti-aircraft missile FIM-43 Redeye and could begin training.

In October 1978, Lv 2's basic training battalion moved from Korsbetningen (A 7's area) to Visborgsslätt, while the management for Lv 2, personnel and staff department, planning and production department and the artillery, simulation, fire-control system buildings remained at Korsbetningen. Every day from October 1978 to May 1986, the conscripts were transported between Visborgsslätt and Korsbetningen to be trained in their main service. In March 1983, the management moved from its old staff barracks at Korsbetningen to newly renovated premises in the top floor of the Chancellery building at Visborgsslätt. During the spring of 1986, Lv 2 could gradually settle in the newly built artillery/anti-aircraft building at Visborgsslätt. On 24 May 1986, Lv 2 officially moved from Korsbetningen to Visborgsslätt. At the same time, Lv 2 celebrated 50 years of air defense training on Gotland.

Through a reorganization of the Gotland Anti-Aircraft Battalion in 1994, the Gotland Anti-Aircraft Corps (Lv 2) was formed. The corps was disbanded on 31 August 2000 by previous decisions in the Defence Act of 2000.

Locations and training areas

On 1 April 1944, the anti-aircraft defense on Gotland was transferred from the Coastal Artillery to Stockholm Anti-Aircraft Regiment (Lv 3), which formed the detachment Stockholm Anti-Aircraft Regiment's Battery on Gotland (Lv 3 G). The detachment was placed in a barracks camp by Söderväg in southwest Visby. In 1945, detachment moved into barracks 2 and 3, which were built the same year at Gotland Artillery Corps (A 7) barracks area at Östra Hansegatan. From 1 November 1952, the detachment was transferred to Östgöta Anti-Aircraft Regiment (Lv 2). From 1978, the conscript training was transferred to Gotland Regiment's (P 18) barracks area in southern Visby, where also the staff was moved on 17 March 1983.

Heraldry and traditions

Colours, standards and guidons
On 6 June 1941, the Chief of the Army Lieutenant General Ivar Holmquist presented the colours to Östgöta Anti-Aircraft Regiment, which was carried by the regiment until 31 March 1962. The colours was then transferred to the Gotland battery, which at the same time was reorganized into an independent unit under the name of Gotland Anti-Aircraft Division (Lv 2), who came to carry the colours on certain occasions. Gotland Anti-Aircraft Division also took over the regiment traditions, and continued them until 31 August 2000. From 1 September 2000, the Air Defence Regiment (Lv 6) retains the memory of all disbanded anti-aircraft units.

In 1963, the colours was presented to Gotland Anti-Aircraft Division by the Chief of the Army, Lieutenant General Curt Göransson.

Coat of arms
The coat of the arms of the Gotland Anti-Aircraft Battalion 1977–1994 and the Gotland Anti-Aircraft Corps 1994–2000. Blazon: "Azure, the provincial badge of Gotland, a ram passant argent armed or, banner gules with crosstaff, edging and five flaps or. The shield surmounted two gunbarrels of older pattern in saltire and two wings, both or".

Medals
In 1990, the Gotlands luftvärnsbataljons (Lv 2) hedersmedalj ("Gotland Anti-Aircraft Battalion (Lv 2) Honorary Medal") in gold (GotlvkGM) of the 8th size was established. From 1994 to 2000, the medal was called Gotlands luftvärnskårs (Lv 2) hedersmedalj ("Gotland Anti-Aircraft Corps Honorary Medal") in gold (GotlvbatGM). The medal ribbon is of white moiré with a broad red stripe on each side.

In 2000, the Gotlands luftvärnskårs (Lv 2) minnesmedalj ("Gotland Anti-Aircraft Corps (Lv 2) Commemorative Medal") in silver (GotlvkSMM) of the 8th size was established. The medal ribbon is divided in red, white, orange, white and red moiré.

Commanding officers

Commanding officers:

 1944-04-01 – 1948-09-30: Capt Ewald Fock
 1948-10-01 – 1954-03-31: Capt Lars Gustav Falk
 1954-04-01 – 1956-09-30: Capt Gunnar Almqvist
 1956-10-01 – 1961-03-31: Capt Lars Erik Lidsjö
 1961-04-01 – 1972-09-30: Maj/LtCol Uno Engström
 1972-10-01 – 1976-03-31: LtCol Per-Olof Martin
 1976-04-01 – 1981-03-31: LtCol Lars Brunnberg
 1981-04-01 – 1989-03-31: LtCol Hans Ahldén
 1989-04-01 – 1992-06-30: LtCol Gunnar Jansson
 1992-07-01 – 1994-08-31: LtCol Benkt Kullgard
 1997-09-01 – 1999-09-30: LtCol Kent Samuelsson
 1999-10-01 – 2000-08-31: LtCol Göran Wahlqvist

Names, designations and locations

See also
List of Swedish anti-aircraft regiments

Footnotes

References

Notes

Print

Further reading

External links
 Lv 2 Kamratförening 

Air defence corps of the Swedish Army
Disbanded units and formations of Sweden
Military units and formations established in 1944
Military units and formations disestablished in 2000
1944 establishments in Sweden
2000 disestablishments in Sweden
Visby Garrison